Apex Hotels is an operator of three star and four star hotels based in Edinburgh, Scotland. The company operates ten hotels in the United Kingdom.

History
Executive Chairman of Apex Hotels, Norman Springford, was previously an employee of the Inland Revenue and owner/operator of a number of public houses, bingo halls, and the Edinburgh Playhouse. In 1996 Norman opened his first hotel, the Apex International Hotel, in Edinburgh. The group now own 9 UK hotels across London, Edinburgh, Glasgow and Dundee.

References

External links

1996 establishments in Scotland
Companies based in Edinburgh
Hotels established in 1996
Hotel chains in the United Kingdom